University of Barishal (also known as Barishal University or simply BU) is a public university located in Barishal, a divisional city in southern Bangladesh. It is the only general public university in Barishal division and the country's 33rd public university.

The university was established in 2011 and began academic activities at undergraduate level in six departments under four faculties on 24 January 2012. The university currently offers degrees at undergraduate and postgraduate levels. The university houses twenty-four academic departments under six faculties, where eighteen departments are currently providing postgraduate degrees. Every year almost 1450 students are admitted to undergraduate programs in the university. The university started its academic activities in the temporary campus at Barishal Zilla School and then shifted to its permanent campus. The permanent suburban campus of 50 acres of the university is located in Barisal Sadar Upazila beside Dhaka-Patuakhali Highway on the bank of Kirtankhola river.

Location
University of Barishal is situated in the district of Barishal under Barishal Division. It is located at Karnakathi on the eastern bank of the Kirtonkhola river beside the Barishal-Patuakhali highway about 2 kilometers from the center of Barishal City. The university campus is founded on 50 acres of land.

History

Demand for a university in the area was first made in 1960 before the independence of Bangladesh. In 1973, then-Prime Minister Sheikh Mujibur Rahman declared he wished to establish a university in Barishal during a rally held in the city. President Ziaur Rahman made a similar statement concerning establishing a university in Barishal on 23 November 1978, at a rally in Barishal Circuit House. In 1990s, former president Abdur Rahman Biswas also made a statement for the establishment of the university.

After three decades, following strong demand from the people of Barisal, the proposal was passed in ECNEC on 20 November 2008, by then Caretaker Government. The law of the University of Barishal has been amended and passed by the National Assembly of Bangladesh on 16 June 2010. On 22 February 2011, Prime Minister Sheikh Hasina inaugurated the construction of a building of the university. The university officially started functioning from the first day of July 2011 in a temporary campus at Barisal Zilla School. Educational activities were inaugurated by Minister for Education Nurul Islam Nahid on 24 January 2012, in the temporary campus of the university. President Zillur Rahman and Professor Dr. Md. Harunor Rashid Khan, from University of Dhaka adorned the chairs of the Founder Chancellor and Vice-Chancellor respectively.

The construction of the main campus started in 2012 which is located at Karnakathi on the eastern bank of the Kirtankhola river in Barisal Sadar Upazila. Tk. 900  million was sanctioned to construct the university on 50 acres of land, including 12 acres of private and 38 acres public land.

In academic year 2011–2012 around 400 students were enrolled in six inaugural departments - English, Management, Marketing, Economics and Mathematics.

Campus 

The university campus covers an area of 50 acres, and is landscaped around the Kirtankhola river with field areas and plants making the campus a natural arboretum. Facilities include academic buildings, administration building, auditorium, library, computer centre, workshop, research laboratories, halls of residence, teachers' quarter, mosque etc. The university has inside its boundaries a bank, a canteen and a large auditorium.

Transportation 
The university runs its own regular bus service to and from the city to facilitate frequent commuting of the students residing there. Friday and Saturday are weekly holidays. The university own single and doubled-decker buses as well as microbuses to facilitate transport of students, staff and faculty members.

Medical Center 
The University Medical Center is equipped for primary care but serious cases are referred to a Medical college hospital (Sher -E -Bangla Medical College Hospital) which is about 4 kilometres away.

Sports and entertainment 
The university provides facilities for football, cricket, volleyball, table tennis etc. The students play tennis, badminton and other games as well. The students arrange debate, cultural show etc. The annual sports events are arranged at University Playground.

Library 
The library has more than 20,000 books and hundreds of journals and periodicals in its collection. Approximately 150 students can use these facilities at a time.

Halls of residence
There are four dormitories for students.

Boy's halls

Girl's halls

Administration 
According to the laws of University of Barishal, the university is mainly governed by two bodies; the Syndicate and the Academic Council, both chaired by vice chancellor. The position of the chancellor is chaired by the President of Bangladesh and currently held by President Abdul Hamid. The current vice chancellor is Prof. Dr. Md. Sadequl Arefin. Founder chancellor and vice chancellor were President Zillur Rahman and Prof. Dr. Md. Harunor Rashid Khan.

Vice chancellor

Academics 
Academic activities of the university began with undergraduate classes for the 2011–12 academic year on 24 January 2012. The University of Barishal initially started with four faculties (Arts, Science, Social Sciences and Business Studies) and six departments: Mathematics, Management Studies, Marketing, Economics, Sociology, and English. The university currently has 24 departments in 6 faculties. Both undergraduate and graduate degrees are provided from all the departments. The total number of undergraduate enrollment in all departments for 2020–21 academic year was 1440. The medium of instruction is English, which is the official medium of examination in effect in all departments of the university except in the department of Bangla. Bangla is occasionally followed while teaching.

References

External links
 Official website

Public universities of Bangladesh
Education in Barisal
Educational institutions established in 2011
2011 establishments in Bangladesh